Hollybush railway station was a railway station in East Ayrshire, Scotland that served the nearby Hollybush Hotel and the rural district. The line on which the old station stands was originally part of the Ayr and Dalmellington Railway, worked and later owned by the Glasgow and South Western Railway. The station, opened as Hollybush later became part of the London, Midland and Scottish Railway and was closed by the British Railways Board (BRB).

History 
The Ayr and Dalmellington Railway began as the Ayrshire and Galloway (Smithstown & Dalmellington) Railway, with its enabling legislation receiving royal assent on 8 June 1847. The branch line was planned to run between Waterside and Sillyhole near Dalmellington, however the company evolved into the Ayr and Dalmellington Railway, with further legislation receiving royal assent on 4 August 1853 to allow the tracks to be extended to both Ayr and Dalmellington.

In 1856 the station had a single building and one siding, approached down a lane that ran from the Malcomston Bridge. The 1894 OS shows a larger station building complex, several sidings, a loading dock, goods shed, railway cottages and an access off the side road. In 1908 a weigh machine was present, a signal box close to the overbridge and a crane near the railway cottages. By 1971 the sidings had been lifted and the nearby school off the B7034 was closed.

The majority of the line is still open today (datum 2013) for freight trains serving opencast mining sites in the area.

The station house survives as a private dwelling lying just off the A713 Ayr, however the old platform has been demolished.

Micro-history
The evergreen holly Ilex aquifolium plant has been used a pub sign since Roman times and thus became a popular name for inns such as the one that Hollybush station is named from.

Notes

References 
Notes

Sources

External links
 Hollybush station
 Hollybush railway
 The Old station nameboard

Disused railway stations in East Ayrshire
Railway stations in Great Britain opened in 1856
Railway stations in Great Britain closed in 1964
Beeching closures in Scotland
Former Glasgow and South Western Railway stations